is a passenger railway station located in the city of Tsuchiura, Ibaraki Prefecture, Japan operated by the East Japan Railway Company (JR East).

Lines
Arakawaoki Station is served by the Jōban Line, and is located 57.2 km from the official starting point of the line at Nippori Station.

Station layout
The station is an elevated station with two opposed side platforms. It has a Midori no Madoguchi staffed ticket office.

Platforms

History
Arakawaoki Station opened on 25 December 1896. The station was absorbed into the JR East network upon the privatization of the Japanese National Railways (JNR) on 1 April 1987. 
On 23 March 2008, one person was killed and seven people injured when a man (Masahiro Kanagawa, aged 24) went on a stabbing spree with two knives in the passageway linking the station to the nearby shopping street.

Passenger statistics
In fiscal 2019, the station was used by an average of 8158 passengers daily (boarding passengers only).

Surrounding area
former Arakawaoki-shuku
Tsuchiura-Arakawaoki Post Office
JGSDF Camp Kasumigaura

See also
 List of railway stations in Japan

References

External links

  Station information JR East Station Information 

Railway stations in Ibaraki Prefecture
Jōban Line
Railway stations in Japan opened in 1896
Tsuchiura